Unusual Suspects is an album by English singer-songwriter Julia Fordham and American comedian, actor, writer, and musician Paul Reiser. It was released in 2010. The album's ten songs are sung by Fordham, who also wrote the lyrics, while Reiser provides the piano playing and wrote the music.

Background
Before the 'unusual' collaboration between the two came about, Reiser was asked in an interview who he listened to in the car; he replied "Julia Fordham", after hearing a song by the singer whilst driving and being captivated by her voice. This led to Fordham contacting Reiser to thank him. Years later, the two coincidentally met at a movie screening and Reiser had the idea of collaborating, as he had already started writing music, to which Fordham agreed.

The album's first single, "UnSung Hero", pays tribute to US troops serving overseas, and their families who offer support from home.

Track listing
All tracks written by Julia Fordham (lyrics) and Paul Reiser (music).
"You Keep Me On My Feet"
"Fine"
"Shadow"
"UnSung Hero"
"Good Ship"
"Stolen Kiss"
"Walking Shoes"
"Say Hey Kid"
"Trusted"
"Minefield"

Personnel
Adapted from the Unusual Suspects liner notes.

Musicians
Julia Fordham – vocals
Paul Reiser – piano, keyboards
Steven Argila – keyboards
Chris Bleth – woodwinds and duduk
Ray Brinker – drums, percussion
James Harrah – guitar
Trey Henry – bass
Mark Isham – trumpet
Bart Samolis – bass
Jason Smith – additional percussion
Cameron Stone – cello
Violet Finn, Marley Gazaryants, Noa Gross, Weston Krause, Jennifer Mendez, Erin Murray, Eireann O'Grady, Laura Rush, Kenner Valentin, Gabriella Watkin – children's choir

Production
Produced by Steven Argila
Mixed and engineered by Stephen Krause
Mastered by Dave Collins
Arrangements by Paul Reiser and Steven Argila
Photography – Simon Gluckman
Art and design – Joan Scheibel

References

External links
Unusual Suspects at Discogs

2010 albums
Julia Fordham albums
Collaborative albums